is a Japanese professional shogi player ranked 5-dan.

Early life
Saitō was born in Kawasaki, Kanagawa on July 17, 1998. He learned how to play shogi from his father as a young boy before entering elementary school.

In September 2010, Saitō was accepted into the Japan Shogi Association (JSA) apprentice school as a pupil of shogi professional  at the rank of 6-kyū. He was promoted to the rank of apprentice professional 3-dan in 2015, and obtained full professional status and the corresponding rank of 4-dan in October 2017 after winning the 61st 3-dan League (April 2017September 2017) with a record of 14 wins and 4 losses.

Promotion history
The promotion history for Saitō is as follows.
 6-kyū: September 2010
 3-dan: October 2015
 4-dan: October 1, 2017
 5-dan: January 14, 2021

References

External links
 
 ShogiHub: Professional Player Info · Saito, Asuto

Japanese shogi players
Living people
Professional shogi players
People from Kawasaki, Kanagawa
Professional shogi players from Kanagawa Prefecture
1998 births